St. Anthony's High School is a Roman Catholic college preparatory (grades 9–12) school located in  South Huntington, New York on Long Island. The school was founded in 1933 by the Franciscan Brothers of Brooklyn

History
The school was founded as St. Anthony's Juniorate by the Franciscan Brothers of Brooklyn, New York in September 1931.  At the time, it was designed to be an all-boys preparatory boarding school for prospective novitiates.

On August 31, 1933, ground broke on the Juniorate's new facility in Smithtown, New York. Students interested in the Juniorate attended St. Francis Preparatory School, which was then located in Brooklyn. The ground-breaking marks the founding of St. Anthony's and appears on the school's crest. The school never expanded to more than 50 or 60 pupils at one time during the early years.  The first five students graduated in June 1935.

In 1949, the Franciscan Novitiate moved from Smithtown to Wyandanch, New York.

In 1958, the Juniorate expanded into a day school to serve the boys of the nearby towns. Anticipating this change, the school admitted no freshmen for a period of one year and changed its name to St. Anthony's High School. The school began to grow in size to its current population of nearly 2,500.

In June 1969, the school's juniorate program was terminated. Following the end of the program was a substantial increase in the percentage of lay faculty members and the presence of nuns.

On December 5, 1983, Most Reverend John R. McGann announced that, as part of extensive changes in the educational plans of the Roman Catholic Diocese of Rockville Centre, Holy Family Diocesan High School, South Huntington, New York, would close in June 1984, and St. Anthony's High School will re-locate in the Holy Family facility.  The two schools were athletic rivals and the students and faculty were blended into one school.  The last mixed class graduated in 1987, and the first class to spend all four years at St. Anthony's H.S. in Huntington graduated in 1988.

Following this, the school began to admit young women. St. Anthony's is currently located in this former Holy Family location at 275 Wolf Hill Road in South Huntington.

Curriculum
The basic curriculum at St. Anthony's includes required courses in Theology, English, Social Studies and Physical Education (4 years); Mathematics, Science, Foreign Language (3 years); Fine Arts (Health, Art, Music or Drama) (1 year). Honors and Advanced Placement courses are offered to students who qualify, with electives in all disciplines. The passing grade at St. Anthony's is 75% to ensure that each student leaves with a higher standard of excellence before entering college and a minimum grade of 80% is required for any letter of recommendation to college.

Notable alumni

 Chris Algieri,('02),  WBO Light Welterweight Champion, ISKA World Welterweight Champion, WKA World Super Welterweight Champion.
 Chris Armas, Former USA Soccer National team member
 Kenny Atkinson, Head Coach of the Brooklyn Nets
 Dan Barry ('76), NY Times reporter
 John Gregorek ('78), Olympian
 Alan Hahn, ('89), Analyst for the New York Knicks on MSG Networks
 Pat Kirwan, NFL player, coach and executive
 Mike Komisarek, NHL hockey player; defenseman selected to 08-09 NHL All-Star game
 Nick LaLota, Member of the United States House of Representatives from New York's 1st congressional district since 2023
 Brian McNamara ('78), actor
 Jim Pavese, Former NHL hockey player for the St. Louis Blues, New York Rangers, Detroit Red Wings, and Hartford Whalers
 Paul Scheer ('94), actor
 Tom Schreiber,('10) Professional lacrosse player, four-time All-American, all-time leading scorer at Princeton
 Rob Scuderi ('97), NHL hockey player; defenseman and Stanley Cup Champion with the Pittsburgh Penguins 2009 and the L.A. Kings 2012
 Richard Wiese ('77), explorer, Emmy-winning host and producer, president of the Explorers Club

References

External links
 St. Anthony's High School official website
 St. Anthony's Fathers' Guild
 St. Anthony's Mothers' Guild
 St. Anthony's High School Alumni Association website

Educational institutions established in 1933
Catholic secondary schools in New York (state)
Huntington, New York
Roman Catholic Diocese of Rockville Centre
Schools in Suffolk County, New York
1933 establishments in New York (state)